Emma Elizabeth Smith ( 1843 – 4 April 1888) was a prostitute and murder victim of mysterious origins in late-19th century London. Her killing was the first of the Whitechapel murders, and it is possible she was a victim of the serial killer known as Jack the Ripper, though this is considered unlikely by most modern authors.

Life and murder
Smith's life prior to her murder in 1888 remains mysterious. Police files were gathered during the investigation, but most of these are missing, apparently taken, mislaid or discarded from the Metropolitan Police archive before the transfer of papers to the Public Record Office. In the surviving records, Inspector Edmund Reid notes a "son and daughter living in Finsbury Park area". Walter Dew, a detective constable stationed with H Division, later wrote:

At the time of her death in 1888, Smith was living in a lodging-house at 18 George Street (since renamed Lolesworth Street), Spitalfields, in the East End of London. She was viciously assaulted at the junction of Osborn Street and Brick Lane, Whitechapel, in the early hours of Tuesday 3 April 1888, the day after the Easter Monday bank holiday. She survived the attack and, although injured, managed to walk back to her lodging house. She told the deputy keeper, Mary Russell, that she was attacked by two or three men, one of whom was a teenager. Mrs Russell and one of the other lodgers, Annie Lee, took Smith to the London Hospital, where she was treated by house surgeon George Haslip. She fell into a coma and died the next day at 9 a.m. Medical investigation by the duty surgeon, Dr G. H. Hillier, revealed that a blunt object had been inserted into her vagina, rupturing her peritoneum. The police were not informed of the incident until 6 April when they were told an inquest was to be held the next day. The inquest at the hospital, which was conducted by the coroner for East Middlesex, Wynne Edwin Baxter, was attended by Russell, Hillier, and the local chief inspector of the Metropolitan Police Service, H Division Whitechapel: John West. The inquest jury returned a verdict of murder by person or persons unknown.

Chief Inspector West placed the investigation in the hands of Inspector Edmund Reid of H Division. Reid noted in his report that her clothing was "in such dirty ragged condition that it was impossible to tell if any part of it had been fresh torn". Walter Dew later described the investigation:

Smith had not provided descriptions of the men who had attacked her and no witnesses came forward or were found. The investigation proved fruitless and the murderer or murderers were never caught.

Whitechapel murders
The case was listed as the first of eleven Whitechapel murders in Metropolitan Police files. Although elements of the press linked her death to the later murders, which were blamed on a single serial killer known as "Jack the Ripper", her murder is unlikely to be connected with the later killings. With the exception of Walter Dew, who said he thought that Smith was the first victim of the Ripper, the police suspected it was the unrelated work of a criminal gang. Smith either refused to or could not describe her attackers in any form of detail, possibly because she feared reprisal. Prostitutes were often managed by gangs, and Smith could have been attacked by her pimps as a punishment for disobeying them, or as part of their intimidation.

References

Bibliography
 Begg, Paul (2003). Jack the Ripper: The Definitive History. London: Pearson Education. 
 Connell, Nicholas (2005). Walter Dew: The Man Who Caught Crippen. Stroud, Gloucestershire: The History Press. 
 Cook, Andrew (2009). Jack the Ripper. Stroud, Gloucestershire: Amberley Publishing. 
 Evans, Stewart P.; Rumbelow, Donald (2006). Jack the Ripper: Scotland Yard Investigates. Stroud: Sutton. 
 Evans, Stewart P.; Skinner, Keith (2000). The Ultimate Jack the Ripper Sourcebook: An Illustrated Encyclopedia. London: Constable and Robinson. 
 Honeycombe, Gordon (1982). The Murders of the Black Museum: 1870-1970, London: Bloomsbury Books, 
 Marriott, Trevor (2005). Jack the Ripper: The 21st Century Investigation. London: John Blake. 
 Rumbelow, Donald (2004). The Complete Jack the Ripper: Fully Revised and Updated. Penguin Books. 

1840s births
1880s murders in London
1888 murders in the United Kingdom
1888 deaths
19th-century English women
April 1888 events
English female prostitutes
English murder victims
Female murder victims
People of the Victorian era
Women of the Victorian era